Belmont Intermediate School is a state coeducational intermediate school located in Belmont on the North Shore of Auckland, New Zealand. It was established in 1957. 

Contributing schools include: 
Devonport Primary
Vauxhall Primary
Stanley Bay Primary
Hauraki Primary
St. Leos
Belmont Primary
Bayswater Primary.

Pupils attend for years seven and eight. As of 2007 there were just over 500 pupils enrolled. At the end of year eight the majority of students move to Takapuna Grammar School, which is located next door. 

School facilities include a technology block, ICT suite, school hall, information centre and a learning support centre. The grounds are extensive and numerous groups make use of its facilities during the weekends.

Cycling to school 
The school is famous for having achieved the highest rate of students cycling to school in the Auckland Region, at about 200 of 500 students on a normal day, a results considered to be partly due to the environment around the school and the Lake Road cycle lanes. At the same time, the level of students driven to school by car is very low, at only about 11% arrive by car.

In 2010, after being nominated by Cycle Action Auckland, the school won the national Cycle Friendly Awards in the "commitment by a public organisation", sponsored by ASB Bank.

Notable alumni
 Ella Yelich-O'Connor, aka Lorde (2008–2009), singer-songwriter. 
 Eliza McCartney, (2008-2009), NZ olympian Bronze Medalist, Rio 2016

References

External links

Knowledge Net

Educational institutions established in 1957
Intermediate schools in Auckland
North Shore, New Zealand
1957 establishments in New Zealand